Stein Versto (born 30 December 1957) is a Norwegian poet, novelist, translator and folk musician.

He was born in Vinje, and was a brother of newspaper editor Olav Versto. He made his literary debut in 1990 with the short story collection Ho blei borte i trappene, for which he was awarded the Tarjei Vesaas' debutantpris. Among his poetry collections are Innfalda tid, minne from 1995 and Snø i partituret from 2000. He wrote the novel Nidaros in 2013. His music album Urjen from 2011 contains tunes played on Hardanger fiddle. He also resided in Asker.

References

1957 births
Living people
People from Vinje
Norwegian fiddlers
Male violinists
20th-century Norwegian poets
Norwegian male poets
21st-century Norwegian novelists
Norwegian male novelists
20th-century Norwegian male writers
21st-century Norwegian male writers
21st-century violinists
21st-century Norwegian male musicians
NorCD artists